Walt Whitman Park is a park located on E Street, NW between 19th & 20th Streets, NW in the Foggy Bottom neighborhood of Washington, D.C.  There is a small playground in the eastern end of the park, across from Rawlins Park. Directly south of the park is the United States Office of Personnel Management (OPM). North of the park is the Elliott School of International Affairs Building of the George Washington University.

References

Foggy Bottom
George Washington University
National Mall and Memorial Parks
Parks in Washington, D.C.